is a series of horse racing video games, created by Tecmo.

Overview
Gallop Racer is an open-ended racing game in which the player purchases horses to train, race and breed.  Most games in the series involve management of horses, with the exception of Gallop Racer 2004, which focuses more on the jockeying riders.  Horses are divided into four leg types: frontrunner, preceder, midrunner and closer, and the player must carefully choose the best leg type suited for each race to have the best stamina and strength available.  Race course terrain can either be dirt or turf, with horses excelling in either or both terrain types.  Due to licensing issues, the series does not use the names of real-life horse breeds, jockey contests or famous race courses, a trait that also carries over to the crossover game Champion Jockey: G1 Jockey & Gallop Racer.  Races are divided into four classes based on horse quality and type of race: open, grade III, grade II and grade I.  Higher-graded and more difficult races are unavailable from the start and must be unlocked by accomplishing certain achievements and winning certain races.  Race course lengths range from 5 furlongs (5/8 mile) to 20 furlongs (2.5 miles) and are designed to closely resemble real-life courses in distance and shape in spite of an inability to secure licensing rights to use their official names.

Games
Most games in the series are available on early Sony consoles, with early installments available on arcade machines.  All games in the series are available in Japan, with sequels utilizing standard sequel numeration.  The first Gallop Racer home video game available in North America is a port of the third game of the series and is plainly titled Gallop Racer.  When most of that game's subsequent sequels were localized for North America, they would be numerated on the basis of their year of release there in a convention not dissimilar to annually released sports games in various EA Sports franchises and later titles in Konami's Pro Evolution Soccer series.  Only the sixth and seventh installments of the series would be localized for a European release, with the former being endorsed by the British Isles' attheraces horse racing sports network.  After Tecmo merged with Koei, the creator of rival horse racing series G1 Jockey, a crossover video game that incorporates mechanics from both G1 Jockey and Gallop Racer, Champion Jockey: G1 Jockey & Gallop Racer was released internationally in 2011 as the first and only game in this series to be available on non-Sony consoles and support the use of commercial motion controllers.

Notes

Reception
The games are bestsellers in Japan.

References

External links
Gallop Racer 2006 at the Tecmo web site.
 The Online Racing League World is the largest Gallop Racer series support group.

1996 video games
Horse racing video games
Arcade video games
PlayStation (console) games
PlayStation 2 games
Koei Tecmo franchises
Tecmo games
Video game franchises introduced in 1996
Video games developed in Japan